The National Council of Labour Colleges (NCLC) was an organisation set up in the United Kingdom to foster independent working class education.

The organisation was founded at a convention held in the Clarion Club House, Yardley, Birmingham on 8/9 October 1921. Its role was to act as  a co-ordinating body for the movement of labour colleges, including the Central Labour College.

The National Council of Labour Colleges absorbed the Plebs League the year after the 1926 United Kingdom general strike, and continued to publish the Plebs' Magazine.

The NCLC offered educational schemes to such organisations as the National Clarion Cycling Club, in which they offered:
 Free access to NCLC classes
 Free access to non-residential day schools
 Occasional lectures provided at meetings
 Free NCLC correspondence courses for which the NCLC ran adverts on the inside back cover of The Clarion Cyclist.

In 1964, the NCLC merged with the Workers' Educational Trade Union Committee to form the Trades Union Congress Education Department.

References

Further reading 

 Gibson, I., 'Marxism and Ethical Socialism in Britain: the case of Winifred and Frank Horrabin' (BA Thesis, University of Oxford, 2008)
 McIlroy, J., 'Independent Working Class Education and Trade Union Education and Training' in Roger Fieldhouse (ed.), A History of Modern British Adult Education (Leicester, 1996), ch.10
 Macintyre, S., A Proletarian Science: Marxism in Britain 1917-33 (Cambridge, 1980)
 Millar, J.P.M.M., The Labour College Movement (London, 1979)
 Phillips, A. and Putnam, T., 'Education for Emancipation: The Movement for Independent Working-Class Education 1908-1928', Capital and Class, 10 (1980), pp.18-42
 Rée, J., Proletarian Philosophers: Problems in Socialist Culture in Britain, 1900-1940 (Oxford, 1984)
 Samuel, R., "British Marxist Historians, 1880-1980: Part One", NLR, 120 (1980), pp.21-96
 Samuel, R., The Lost World of British Communism (London, 2006)
 Simon, B., `The Struggle for Hegemony, 1920- 1926' in idem (ed.), The Search for Enlightenment: The Working Class and Adult Education in the Twentieth Century, (London, 1990), pp.15-70

Socialist education
Education in the United Kingdom
Labor schools